A life insurance tax shelter uses investments in insurance to protect income or assets from tax liabilities.  Life insurance proceeds are not taxable in many jurisdictions.  Since most other forms of income are taxable (such as capital gains, dividends and interest income), consumers are often advised to purchase life insurance policies to either offset future tax liabilities, or to shelter the growth of their investments from taxation. This insurance product is also known as Private placement life insurance.

Life insurance to cover future taxes
In those jurisdictions where life insurance proceeds are only tax-free at death, tax liabilities that come due at death are often offset by a policy of the same size.  Since the mathematics required to compare different strategies is quite complex, most consumers defer to an accountant or life insurance agent for advice.  However, there is often vast differences of opinion between these professionals, even given the same starting conditions.  This should not be surprising, given the huge future differences that even small variances in starting conditions can make.

For example, assume that an individual is likely to owe $100,000.00 in taxes at death.  If a permanent life insurance policy with a $100,000.00 death benefit costs $1,000 per year (remaining level for life), and the life expectancy of the person is 30 years, then the following events could occur:

 The individual could die early.  In this case, it is unlikely that any alternative investment of the $1000 per year would have yielded the required $100,000.00 at death.
 The individual could live much longer than expected. The individual could have built up a significant cash value within the policy, depending on investment selection. As such, the individual would have access to these cash values tax-free regardless of growth, provided it is set up properly. 

Since one normally does not know which of these will occur (see adverse selection) calculations must be based on expected life expectancies for people of similar gender, physical condition, and behaviour.

Life insurance to shelter investment growth and income
In an attempt to achieve the "best of both worlds" (protection in the case of early death, and additional tax-protected returns in the case of long life), life insurance policies were created containing investment accounts having preferential tax treatment. 
This is most often done with a Variable universal life policy.  See that article for some discussion of the tax issues.

References and Additional Resources 

Life insurance
Tax incidence